Minimalist photography is a form of photography that is distinguished by austere simplicity. It emphasizes sparseness and careful composition, shying away from overabundance of color, patterns, or information.

Etymology 

Minimalist photography arises from the notion of minimalism in art, which is a style used by many 20th century artists. This style emphasizes the use of a minimal number of compositional elements: color, objects, shapes and texture. The aim of minimalist photography is to express a concept, in order to bring forth a distinctive visual experience or elicit an emotional response from the viewer. In the world of photography, it is viewed as an exceptionally intuitive and personal concept, entrusting interpretation and understanding to the audience perspective of the art .

History 
Minimalist photography arose in 1960s America from the minimalist movement. As the name denotes, minimalism uses a limited amount of elements to achieve a restricted or simplified end product. While minimalism may manifest in many ways in other art forms, minimalist photography usually tends to make great use of negative space, employs sparse composition, and centers a strong singular focal point. Over the decades, minimalist photographers such as Michael Kenna, Hiroshi Sugimoto, Grant Hamilton, and Mark Meyer have risen to prominence in the art world and gained fame for their minimalist photography.

Technique 

Minimalist photography focuses on simplicity and its artistic style can be encapsulated by the quote, "less is more." Minimalist photographers achieve this effect by casting aside all the unnecessary components in creating their works. This principle is demonstrated in various minimalist photographs, for example, when capturing a mountain or an ocean on camera, the entirety of the scenery will be presented as one big vast space. The vacancy and bareness of the space shown enables the audience to imagine and craft their own version of interpretation and comprehension, instead of including the photographer's own inputs and insights. In order to expand and concentrate on the expansive space, it is crucial to minimize contradicting elements such as people or distracting buildings. Doing so conveys a sense of barrenness and desolation that creates a theatrical atmosphere and visual experience. Therefore, a minimalist photograph is often captured early in the morning, sunrise or dark at night. This ensures that the scene is not filled with crowds and that the overall composition appears neat and simplified.

Minimalist photography 
"As an approach in photography, minimalism or minimalistic photography could be taken by the photographer in all genres. No matter your are a portrait, architecture, landscape etc. photographer, minimalist photos are always an option as long as you have a minimal look toward your surroundings" -Milad Safabakhsh, Founder of Minimalist Photography Awards.

Minimalist photography often pays attention to one single subject in its composition, using nature as its background. Some representative subject matters include geometric patterns, lines and textures, which can range between an apple, a mountain or a bridge, to name a few examples. Although this style of photography is derived from the art movement in the early 1950s.

Gallery

References

See also 

Abstract Imagists
Architectural photography
Digital photography
Landscape painting
Lifestyle photography
Maximalism
Monochrome photography
Nature photography
Night photography
Portrait photography
Simple living
Still life photography
Travel photography

Photography by genre